Team handball at the 1976 Summer Olympics featured competition for men and women.

On 26 July, a Croatian nationalist ran onto the field of play during the men's match between SFR Yugoslavia and West Germany and set fire to the Yugoslav flag before being detained by security.

Medal summary

Participating nations
Each qualified country was allowed to enter one team of 14 players and they all were eligible for participation. Five nations competed in both tournaments. Japan entered only a squad of twelve women and twelve men. Only four male reserve players did not participate (one from Denmark, two from Hungary, and one from Czechoslovakia).

A total of 230(*) handball players (148 men and 82 women) from 12 nations (men from 11 nations – women from 6 nations) competed at the Montreal Games:

  (men:14 women:14)
  (men:13 women:0)
  (men:13 women:0)
  (men:0 women:14)
  (men:14 women:0)
  (men:12 women:14)
  (men:12 women:12)
  (men:14 women:0)
  (men:14 women:14)
  (men:14 women:14)
  (men:14 women:0)
  (men:14 women:0)
(*) NOTE: There are only players counted, which participated in one game at least.

Medal table

References

External links
Official Olympic Report

 
1976 Summer Olympics events
Olym
International handball competitions hosted by Canada